The 2009 Penn Quakers football team was an American football team that represented the University of Pennsylvania in the 2009 NCAA Division I FCS football season. It was the 133rd season of play for the Quakers. The team was led by Al Bagnoli, in his 18th season as head coach. The Quakers played their home games at Franklin Field in Philadelphia. Penn averaged 9,550 fans per game. The season was highlighted by an eight-game winning streak to close the season as Penn captured its 14th Ivy League title, going undefeated in conference play.

Schedule

References

Penn
Penn Quakers football seasons
Ivy League football champion seasons
Penn Quakers football